The Sol Eclipse is a Brazilian single-place paraglider that was designed and produced by Sol Paragliders of Jaraguá do Sul in the mid-2000s. It is now out of production.

Design and development
The Eclipse was designed as an advanced performance glider. The models are each named for their relative size.

Variants
Eclipse S
Small-sized model for lighter pilots. The glider model is AFNOR Performance certified.
Eclipse M
Mid-sized model for medium-weight pilots. The glider model is AFNOR Performance certified.
Eclipse L
Large-sized model for heavier pilots. The glider model is AFNOR Performance certified.

Specifications (Eclipse M)

References

Eclipse
Paragliders